KWCO-FM (105.5 FM, "KOOL 105.5 fm") is a radio station broadcasting a classic hits music format. Licensed to Chickasha, Oklahoma, United States, the station is currently owned by Mollman Media, Inc. Most of KWCO-FM's programming is live and local Monday–Friday 6 AM – 6 PM, and during local sports broadcast coverage. KWCO offers a local swap-shop program Mon–Fri at 9:00 am and 8:30 am on Saturday.

History
The call letters KWCO can be traced back to the original AM 1560 KWCO radio from the 1940s. In the '20s, KOCW was owned by the Oklahoma College for Women (on 1190 then). Due to costs necessary to upgrade the station to newer technical standards set forth by the Federal Radio Commission at the time (in the 1930s), the original KOCW was sold to Griffin. To the surprise of the college, the station was then moved promptly to the Tulsa market, leaving Chickasha without their radio station. So in the '40s when a new station came online, KWCO was picked as the call sign because it was the reverse of KOCW. The station recently has been using Keep, Weird, Chickasha, Oklahoma and a play on the call sign. KWCO was as close to the original call as was available at the time. They simply inverted KOCW to form KWCO. In the mid-'40s the transmitter site was located at Hi 81 and Grand. (close to the current location of Joe's Maytag) The Studio was located in the Briscoe Building at 427 W. Chickasha Ave in 1946. Later, around 1950, the studio was moved out to the tower on Grand and 81. Later, in the 1975, the studio and transmitter site was moved to 500 W. Country Club Rd. KWCO 1560 AM of Chickasha in the 2000s was moved out of Chickasha by Tyler to "Del City" (towers on 15th and I-35) leaving Chickasha without their AM again. KWCO's FM station at 105.5 was left in the market with the legacy of KWCO as KWCO-FM due to co-ownership for a period of time. The current KWCO-FM broadcasts from a former gas station from the '20s in downtown Chickasha at 7th and Chickasha as Chickasha's only commercially licensed radio station. Some of the former calls for KWCO-FM were KTUZ and also KXXK. The original call sign for 105.5 was KNDR, established by Ben DeKinder (a former employee of KWCO (AM) in 1966.

KOOL 105.5 has been in the Classic Hits format since 2002, longer than any other station in the state. It was one of the first to adopt this format in the US.

In the spring of 2013 KWCO-FM began broadcasting in IBOC (HD Radio). 105.5HD2 is 106.1 The Ranch www.1061TheRanch.com, playing a mix of new and old country, and can also be heard on translator K291BR at 106.1 FM.  http://transition.fcc.gov/fcc-bin/fmq?list=0&facid=157206

Translator

Office location
KWCO-FM's office location is 627 W Chickasha Dr in Chickasha. The phone number is 405-224-1560. The studio line is 405-224-9105. In 1982, the Station had one of its most popular times. The Station offices were still located at 500 Country Club Rd, and had a duel call letter format. KWCO 1560 was the AM Top40 format with News, Sports and Weather. KXXK 105 as it was known and The sister station of KWCO. KXXK had a Country Music format and was rather popular. The 2 Stations at the time was a small market station in a mid-market area and served as a pipeline for air personalities for the Greater Oklahoma City market and beyond. Some of the unique parts of KWCO/KXXK was live play-by-play of area High School baseball and other sports, an entire 3-month-long live broadcast from Ray Fine Yamaha Motorcycle Dealership that helped propel the Dealership to one of the biggest in the midwest and southwest south of the Mississippi, and then there was keeping Chickasha safe with Storm coverage from a dedicated team of professionals. One of the most unique things about the KWCO/KXXK was its influx of talent from the State of Michigan from the Spec Howard School of Broadcast Arts. To quote one of the on-air personalities Matt (The Cat) Davidson "It was very interesting having 4 of us at the same time from Michigan working on-air in Oklahoma, but I loved every minute of it". Matt continued, "I got the name Matt The Cat from Ray Fine of Ray Fine Yamaha because I spent the entire summer dining the KXXK morning show there. Probably my most memorable moments came the day I was leaving and did my last show. I got a call from a caller saying "I'm gonna miss that boy from the North" I still think of it today. Hopefully the 4 of us from Michigan had an impact on KWCO/KXXK along with the rest of a truly memorable  time in its history. That is a big part of the KWCO history and shouldn't be discounted.'' The late 80's and through most of the 90's saw KWCO and KXXK continue to stand out as the local station of preference for Grady County and surrounding area. Veteran OKC broadcaster Kenny Belford breathed new life into area sports coverage, bringing with him the "big market sound", with finely crafted productions using network style play-by-play, pregame and recap elements for high school and USAO events. The stations were split on most Thursday/Friday night game nights to allow simultaneous coverage of local Fightin' Chicks sports on the AM station, and a popular area "Game Of The Week" on the FM station. KWCO/KXXK were recipients of OAB awards for excellence in News coverage throughout that period as well under the direction of Belford, News Director Bob Thornton, and another sage OKC broadcaster, Bob Martin, who later went on to own the stations. These stations were among the first in the state to adopt new technology including digital production, digital program delivery, and cellular remote broadcasts using a cutting edge piece of gear, the "Tri-Tech Cellcast", developed by Bob Brewer, brother of KWCO/KXXK owner Jack Brewer.

References

External links

WCO-FM
Classic hits radio stations in the United States
Grady County, Oklahoma
Radio stations established in 1947
1947 establishments in Oklahoma